Overtown is a village in North Lanarkshire, Scotland. Originally developed as a mining village in the 19th century, its population declined after the closure of the coal mines and the associated railways in the 1950s.

The village only has a few buildings of note, Clyde Valley High School, located to the North-West, and Overtown Primary School which was closed in 2016. Overtown also has a community centre, a parish Church which serves as a focal  point for the community and a small number of independent shops and takeaway restaurants. A "First Glasgow" (the former "Hutchison") bus depot is located in the village.

The A71 road, that links Edinburgh with Ayrshire, passes through Overtown. The road is the main street of the village. The West Coast Main Line also passes through the village, but no passenger service trains stop there.

References

External links

Villages in North Lanarkshire
Wishaw
Mining communities in Scotland